Make Your Move is the fifth album by the American duo Captain & Tennille. Released in 1979, the album includes the #1 hit single "Do That to Me One More Time". The album was certified Gold by the RIAA. It is their first album on Casablanca Records.

The song "Happy Together (A Fantasy)" is a cover of the 1967 number 1 hit "Happy Together" by the Turtles.

Track listing
 "Love on a Shoestring" (Kerry Chater, Douglas L.A. Foxworthy) - 3:37
 "No Love in the Morning" (Robert Bellarmine Byrne) - 4:05
 "Deep in the Dark" (Toni Tennille)  - 5:28
 "How Can You Be So Cold" (Toni Tennille) - 7:04
 "Do That to Me One More Time" (Toni Tennille) - 4:17
 "Happy Together (A Fantasy)" (Alan Gordon, Garry Bonner) - 5:26
 "Baby You Still Got It" (Toni Tennille) - 5:32
 "Never Make A Move Too Soon" (Nesbert Hooper Jr., Will Jennings) - 5:57

Charting singles
 "Do That to Me One More Time" #1 Pop/#4 Adult Contemporary US, #7 UK
 "Love on a Shoestring" #55 Pop US 
 "Happy Together (A Fantasy)" #53 Pop/#27 Adult Contemporary US

References
Amazon.com profile for this Make Your Move

1979 albums
Captain & Tennille albums
Casablanca Records albums
Albums recorded at Capitol Studios